Nordkraft (also released as Angels in Fast Motion) is a 2005 Danish drama film, based on the book of the same title by Jakob Ejersbo and written and directed by Ole Christian Madsen, with Kathrine Windfeld as assistant director. The soundtrack includes the track "Rest" from the album All Things to All People.

Cast 
 Thure Lindhardt – Steso
 Signe Egholm Olsen – Maria
 Claus Riis Østergaard – Allan
 Farshad Kholghi – Hossein
 Thomas L. Corneliussen – Asger
 Pernille Vallentin Brandt – Tilde
 Signe Vaupel – Maja
 Rudi Køhnke – Frank
 Joachim Malling – Michael
 Finn Storgaard – Hans Jørgen
 Maria Stenz – Maria's mother
 Kirsten Norholt – Allan's mother
 Søs Egelind – Steso's mother
 Lars Mikkelsen – Steso's father
 Nanna Berg – Nadia
 Ulver Skuli Abildgaard – Bjarne
 Paw Henriksen – Rocker
 Barbara Hesselager – Frank's girlfriend
 Mark Hoppe – Running man
 Rasmus Møller Lauritsen – Junkie
 Nils P. Munk – Aksel
 Priscilla Rasmussen – Mette
 Stanislav Sevcik

Awards and nominations 
Thure Lindhardt won the 2006 Robert Award for Best Actor in a Supporting Role for his role as Steso. It also won the 2006 Robert awards for Best Sound Design, Best Makeup, Best Production Design and Best Song and a nomination for the 2006 Bodil Award for Best Actor in a Leading Role.

References

External links 
 
 
 
 Medierådet

2005 films
2005 drama films
2000s Danish-language films
Danish drama films
Nimbus Film films
Films directed by Ole Christian Madsen
Films set in Denmark
Films shot in Denmark